Les Saules is a station in Paris's express suburban rail system, the RER. It serves the commune of Orly, in the Val-de-Marne department.

See also
List of stations of the Paris RER

External links

 

Railway stations in France opened in 1967
Réseau Express Régional stations
Railway stations in Val-de-Marne